Ripcord or rip cord may refer to:

 Ripcord (skydiving), the mechanism used to release a parachute
 FSB Ripcord, fire support base from the Vietnam War
 Ripcord (album), a 2016 album by Keith Urban
 Ripcord (Amusement Park Ride), an amusement park free-fall ride
 Ripcord (TV series) a 1960s TV series
 Rip Cord (G.I. Joe), a fictional character in the G.I. Joe universe
 Ripcord, a pullstring used with a launcher to make a Beyblade spin
 Ripcord, a cord of yarn under the jacket of an optical cable for jacket removal
 Ripcord Games, a video game publisher
 Ripcord Networks, a voice and video cryptographic security company
 "Ripcord", a song from Radiohead's debut album Pablo Honey

See also
 The Rip Chords, an early-1960s American vocal group
 Ripcordz, a Canadian punk rock band, formed in 1980
 Rip (disambiguation)
 Cord (disambiguation)